Thoatherium (meaning "active swift-beast") is an extinct genus of litoptern mammals from the Early Miocene of Argentina. Fossils of the genus have been found in the Santa Cruz Formation in Argentina.

Description 

Judging from its long legs, it was a fast runner. Thoatherium had remarkably reduced toes; only one horse-like hoof remained. Thoatherium even lacked splint bones, which are remnants of the second and fourth toe found in modern horses. Judging from its generalised, brachydont teeth, Thoatherium fed on soft leaves rather than on tough grasses.

References 

Proterotheriids
Burdigalian life
Miocene mammals of South America
Santacrucian
Neogene Argentina
Fossils of Argentina
Fossil taxa described in 1887
Taxa named by Florentino Ameghino
Prehistoric placental genera